Agenor Girardi, M.S.C. (2 February 1952 – 8 February 2018) was a Roman Catholic bishop.

Girardi was ordained to the priesthood in 1982 in the Missionaries of the Sacred Heart. He served as auxiliary bishop of the Roman Catholic Archdiocese of Porto Alegre, Brazil from 2011 to 2015. He then served as bishop of the Roman Catholic Diocese of União da Vitória, Brazil from 2015 until his death.

Notes

1952 births
2018 deaths
Missionaries of the Sacred Heart
21st-century Roman Catholic bishops in Brazil
Roman Catholic bishops of Porto Alegre
Roman Catholic bishops of União da Vitória